George William Carter (19 October 1900 – 1981) was an English footballer who played as a half-back in the Football League for West Ham United.

Born in West Ham, Essex, Carter played for West Ham Boys, then his works team, Green & Silley Weir of the London Munitions League, before moving to West Ham United for the club's first season of League football in 1919–20.

Often used as understudy to Sid Bishop, George Kay or Jack Tresadern, Carter managed 136 League appearances for the Irons. His only goal came in a 2–1 win against Leeds United on 29 January 1921. He also played 19 FA Cup games for the club.

Carter never fully recovered from a knee injury sustained during a game against Blackburn Rovers on 14 February 1927. After a cartilage operation, he signed on for the following season but did not play. He had a brief stint at Fulham in 1928 and later played for Grays Thurrock.

Carter went on to work for local company Tate & Lyle, and continued his association with the game as a coach with them. He also organised the West Ham six-a-side tournament.

References

1900 births
1981 deaths
Footballers from West Ham
English footballers
Association football midfielders
West Ham United F.C. players
Fulham F.C. players
Grays Thurrock United F.C. players
Association football coaches